Adam Ruins Everything is an American educational comedy television series starring Adam Conover that debuted on September 29, 2015, with a 12-episode season on TruTV. On January 7, 2016, it was announced that the show had been picked up for 14 additional episodes to air starting on August 23, 2016. The series aims to debunk misconceptions that pervade U.S. society.

Series overview

Episodes

Season 1 (2015–16)

Season 2 (2017–18)
On December 7, 2016, TruTV announced that Adam Ruins Everything would return for another season with sixteen episodes. The season premiered on July 11, 2017. An additional six episodes, animated and dubbed Reanimated History, premiered on March 20, 2018.

Season 3 (2019)

References

Lists of American comedy television series episodes